Abdi Shakur Sheikh Hassan Farah (died 10 June 2011) was a Somali politician. He served as the Minister of Interior Affairs and National Security in the Transitional Federal Government of Somalia.

Biography
On November 12, 2010, Farah was appointed Somalia's Minister for Internal Affairs and Security by Mohamed Abdullahi Mohamed, the nation's new Prime Minister. Part of a leaner, technocratic administration, the Cabinet was widely lauded as a welcome break from previous governments.

On June 10, 2011, Farah died at Banadir Hospital in Mogadishu from injuries sustained after a suicide bomber had evaded security and entered his home in Mogadishu. The bomber was his teenage niece Haboon Abdulkadir Hersi Qaaf, who had been recruited by the Islamist insurgent group Al-Shabaab.

The office of Prime Minister Mohamed subsequently issued a press release declaring June 11 a national day of mourning in memory of Farah.

References

Government ministers of Somalia
Year of birth missing
2011 deaths
Deaths by explosive device
Assassinated Somalian politicians
Somalian murder victims
People murdered in Somalia